Star Awards 2005 was the 12th Star Awards ceremony, held on 4 December 2005. It was part of the annual Star Awards organised by MediaCorp for MediaCorp TV Channel 8. Following MediaCorp's merger with SPH MediaWorks on 1 January 2005, the nominees included artistes from the former SPH MediaWorks Channel U, many of whom were former employees of MediaCorp and its predecessor Television Corporation of Singapore. MediaCorp TV Channel 8 broadcast the awards ceremony from 7:00 pm to 10:00 pm while SPH MediaWorks Channel U (now MediaCorp TV Channel U), aired the ceremony for the first time and began broadcasting the ceremony at 7:30 pm.

Prior to the actual ceremony, a separate awards ceremony and gala was held at The Fullerton Hotel in which technical category awards (e.g. Best Director, Best Screenplay, etc.) and the Young Talent Award (child actors) were given out.

The show lasted three hours and saw four artistes winning two awards each, namely Bryan Wong (Best Comedy Performer, Top 10 Most Popular Male Artistes), Chen Hanwei (Best Actor, Top 10 Most Popular Male Artistes), Huang Biren (Best Actress, Top 10 Most Popular Female Artistes) and Quan Yi Fong (Best Variety Show Host, Top 10 Most Popular Female Artistes).

Winners and nominees
Unless otherwise stated, the winners are listed first, highlighted in boldface, or highlighted.

Backstage Achievement Awards Ceremony
As like preceding ceremonies, Professional and Technical Awards were presented before the main ceremony via a clip montage due to time constraints. Unless otherwise stated, the lists of winners are only reflected in the table.

Main Ceremony

Special Award
This award is a special achievement award given out to artiste(s) who have achieved a maximum of 10 popularity awards over 10 years. Top 10 winning years the recipients were awarded together are highlighted in boldface.

Top 10 awards

Guests Performers
The following individuals presented awards or performed musical numbers.

Backstage

Main Ceremony

Star Awards 2006 accolades
The ceremony did not receive nominations for the Best Variety Special in the 2006 ceremony; this was the last time the ceremony did not receive nominations until the 2018 ceremony, 13 years later (in the case, said category was not presented at the time).

External links

2005 television awards
Star Awards